Ujjain district is a district of Madhya Pradesh state in central India. The historic city of Ujjain is the district headquarters. The district has an area of 6,091 km², and a population of 19,86,864 (2011 census), a 16.12% increase from its 2001 population of 17,10,982.

Geography

The district is bounded by the districts of Agar malwa to the north, Shajapur to the east, Dewas to the southeast, Indore to the south, Dhar to the southwest, and Ratlam to the west and northwest. The district is part of Ujjain Division.

Rivers and lakes

The main river is the Shipra river, a tributary of the Chambal river in the east. Other small rivers include the Gambhir river and Kahn river, two tributaries of the Shipra.

Cities and towns

 Ujjain – The city is the administrative centre and chief city of the district and an ancient city situated on the eastern bank of the Kshipra River, Ujjain was the most prominent city on the Malwa plateau of central India for much of its history.
 Nagda – Prior to being an industrial town, Nagda was a small village. The location near river Chambal and availability of acres of land attracted Ghanshyam Das Birla to set up a major facility. Today Nagda is one of the largest viscose staple fiber manufacturers in Asia.
 Badnagar – The city is the birthplace of great national poet Kavi Pradeep. Former Prime Minister of India Atal Bihari Vajpayee spent some of his childhood time in Badnagar. 
 Fatehabad Chandrawatiganj – The city is famous for its railway junction on the Ratlam-Indore meter gauge line with a link line going to Ujjain Junction. 
 Khachrod – It is a city and a municipality in Ujjain district
 Mahidpur – It is a city and a municipality in Ujjain district. The Battle of Mahidpur between the Marathas and the British was fought in this town.
 Tarana – It is a town and a nagar panchayat in Ujjain district.
 Unhel – It is a town and a nagar panchayat in Ujjain district.
 Ghatiya -It is a city and a municipality in Ujjain district. Located in the north of Ujjain city.

Villages
 Jagoti – It is a Gram panchayat in Mahidpur tehsil. It is located at the border of Mahidpur and Ghattiya Tehsil.
 Karaudia

Divisions

At present, after the delimitation of parliamentary and legislative assembly constituencies in 2008, there are eight Vidhan Sabha constituencies in this district: Nagada-Khachrod, Mahidpur, Tarana, Ghatiya, Ujjain Dakshin, Ujjain Uttar, Badnagar including a lot from Ratlam District. It is reserved for the candidates belonging to the Scheduled castes since 1966. The current member of the Lok Sabha from Ujjain constituency is Anil firoziya of the Bharatiya Janata Party (BJP).

Demographics

According to the 2011 census Ujjain District has a population of 1,986,864, roughly equal to the nation of Slovenia or the US state of New Mexico. This gives it a ranking of 233rd in India (out of a total of 640). Its population growth rate over the decade 2001-2011 was 16.11%. Ujjain has a sex ratio of 954 females for every 1000 males, and a literacy rate of 73.55%. 39.22% of the population lives in urban areas. Scheduled Castes and Scheduled Tribes make up 26.36% and 2.45% of the population respectively.

At the time of the 2011 Census of India, 47.58% of the population in the district spoke Malvi, 47.30% Hindi, 2.83% Urdu, 0.58% Gujarati, 0.56% Marathi and 0.40% Sindhi as their first language.

Educational Institutes in Ujjain 
Ujjain District is home to Vikram University located on Dewas Road and Maharshi Panini Sanskrit University.

 Pt. Jawaharlal Nehru Institute of Business Management, Ujjain
 Ruxmaniben Deepchand Gardi Medical College, Ujjain
 Mahakal Institute of Technology, Ujjain
 Govt. Madhav Science PG College, Dewas Road, Ujjain
 Govt. Madhav Arts and Commerce College, Dewas Gate, Ujjain
 Ujjain Engineering College, Ujjain used to be Government Engineering College. Edited by Ravi Soni
 Avantika College
 Mahraja College
 Ujjain Institute of Pharmaceutical Sciences, Ujjain
 Institute of Computer Science, Ujjain
 Lokmany Tilak Education College, Ujjain
 Government Kalidas Girls College, Ujjain
 Govt. Girls PG College. Ujjain,
 Lokmanya Tilak Science And Commerce College, Ujjain
 Sandipani Law College, Ujjain
 Ujjain Polytechnic College, Ujjain
 Alpine Institute of Technology, Ujjain

Vikram Uddhyog Puri

The Government of Madhya Pradesh has allotted 1,200 acres for the development of Knowledge City near Ujjain which will be known as Vikram Uddhyog Puri. The city will be mainly used for the education sector and is a part of the ambitious Delhi Mumbai Industrial Corridor project. The city will come up near Narwar village on Dewas-Ujjain Road.

See also
 Nagda district

References

External links

Ujjain District web site

 
Districts of Madhya Pradesh
Government of Ujjain